This is a list of the heritage sites in Table Mountain as recognized by the South African Heritage Resources Agency.

|}

References 

Tourist attractions in the Western Cape
Table Mountain
Western Cape-related lists